"This Isn't Everything You Are" is a song by Northern Irish-Scottish alternative rock group Snow Patrol.  The track is the second single from the band's sixth studio album, Fallen Empires, it was released as a digital download on 14 October 2011.

Background and writing 
The second single from their sixth album "Fallen Empires" is a lighter-in-the-air anthem that finds them returning to their traditional sound after the electronica elements of their previous single, "Called Out in the Dark."  It was released on November 13, 2011.

Lightbody told Billboard magazine that he wrote the song "to try to protect" the three people experiencing difficulties, adding that he wanted, "to show them that there were people there for them whenever they needed. Sometimes it's hard to reach out, it's hard to ask for help. It's a recurring theme on the record."

The radio and video edit of the song excludes the lines "Is he worth all this, is it a simple yes? / Cause if you have to think, it's fucked / Feels like you loved him more, than he loved you / And you wish you’d never met."

Critical reception 
The song received favorable reviews from music critics. Mike Haydock from BBC Music wrote that it is a "great pop song, full of sparkle and warmth." Simon Gage from Daily Express expressed that "it's anthemic with big guitar breaks". While naming it an "arena rocker", Melissa Maerz from Entertainment Weekly also praised "moments like the gospel-choir chorus of the track", calling it "genuinely affecting." Andy Gill from The Independent also wrote a positive review, saying that "the uplifting title hook, a cross between Coldplay and Elbow, provides the album's most affecting moment." Dave Simpson of The Guardian called it "a doomed love song with a tragic twist."

The song was named the 'Best Track of the Year' by Dan Jenko of FMV Magazine.

Music video
A music video to accompany the release of "This Isn't Everything You Are" was first released onto YouTube on 14 October 2011 at a total length of four minutes and twenty-two seconds. It contains footage filmed in Buenos Aires, Argentina. It was directed by Brett Simon and finds Snow Patrol becoming a house band.

Track listing

Chart performance

Release history

References

2011 singles
Snow Patrol songs
Songs written by Gary Lightbody
Music videos shot in Argentina
Music videos directed by Brett Simon